Raleigh County Schools is a public school district in Raleigh County, West Virginia, located at 105 Adair Street, in the county seat of Beckley, West Virginia. The school district operates 27 public schools, including 17 elementary schools (PK-5), 5 middle schools (6-8), and 4 high schools (9-12). The district also maintains a career-technical education center for high school students and adults. The current superintendent is David Price.

Board of Education 
The Board of Education is made up of five members, each elected to a four-year term in a nonpartisan election. The Board appoints the superintendent.

Schools

Elementary schools
 Bradley Elementary 
 Clear Fork District Elementary
 Coal City Elementary
 Cranberry-Prosperity Elementary
 Crescent Elementary
 Daniels Elementary
 Fairdale Elementary 
 Ghent Elementary
 Hollywood Elementary
 Mabscott Elementary
 Maxwell Hill Elementary
 Stanaford Elementary 
 Shady Spring Elementary
 Marsh Fork Elementary
 Stratton Elementary
 Beckley Elementary
 Ridgeview Elementary

Middle schools
 Trap Hill Middle School
 Park Middle School
 Shady Spring Middle School
 Independence Middle School
 Beckley-Stratton Middle School

High schools
 Academy Of Careers And Technology (formerly Raleigh County Vocational Technical Center)
 Independence High School
 Liberty High School
 Shady Spring High School
 Woodrow Wilson High School

Former Schools 
 Beaver Elementary
 Central Elementary
 Crab Orchard Elementary
 Glen Leigh Grade
 Harper Heights Grade
 Institute Elementary
 Lester Elementary
 Morton-Reaves Grade
 Piney View Elementary
 Slab Fork Grade
 Sophia-Soak Creek Elementary
 Sylvia Elementary
 Eccles Jr. High
 Clear Fork High
 Marsh Fork High 
 Stratton High
 Stoco High
 Sophia High

Notable alumni
 Rob Ashford, Broadway choreographer/Tony Award Winner
 Jim Justice, Billionaire, Owner of The Greenbrier resort and 36th Governor of West Virginia
 Steven C. Johnson, member of the Maryland House of Delegates
 Doug Legursky, Former NFL player
 Jon McBride, First and only West Virginian Astronaut
 Nick Rahall, former United States Congressman
 Chris Sarandon, actor
 Tamar Slay, former NBA player for the New Jersey Nets and Charlotte Bobcats
 Hulett C. Smith, 27th Governor of West Virginia
 Morgan Spurlock, filmmaker

References

External links

School districts in West Virginia
Education in Raleigh County, West Virginia
School districts established in 1850